Uutoni is a Namibian surname. Notable people with the surname include:

Erastus Uutoni (born 1961), Namibian politician
Japhet Uutoni (born 1979), Namibian boxer
Simon Uutoni (born 1970), Namibian footballer

Surnames of African origin